Chambois may refer to:

Chambois, Orne, a commune in the department of Orne, France
Battle of Chambois, a World War II battle fought near Chambois
Chambois, Eure, a commune in the department of Eure, France